Kotli Loharan East is a town in the Sialkot District of Punjab, Pakistan. The name of this town is derived from word Kotli Aunchi (high), the old town in K L East, which later become Kotli Loharan. Many people from this town have migrated to Commonwealth countries, the Middle East and the UK. Most of the original population of this town have moved to the big cities in Pakistan and overseas, especially to Kenya and UK. Majority of current population is new migrants from Jammu and Kashmir, that came there after Indo-Pakistani War of 1947–1948, and some old population. 

Kotli Loharan consists of two subtowns. One is Kotli Loharan West (Laandi (meaning West) Kotli) and other is called Kotli Lohraran East (Chardi (meaning East) Kotli). Many kinds of articles for use and ornament are made, such as shields and arms, betel-nut cutters, knives, boxes, plates, inkstands, and so on. The material used is iron, and gold and silver are used in inlaying.

History 

Supposedly, the town was built or just upgraded, by the British somewhere in the mid 19th Century as a weapons and artillery manufacturing town; the principle bladed weapon maker being J D Pensioner & Sons whose name and location in Kotli Loharan E often appears on Nepalese Gurkha kukri and swords. Most of the original families and residents of the town have moved away to bigger cities in Pakistan, the United States, and the United Kingdom.

Mohalla (Sectors) 
 Hakima
 Rara
 Kashmiri
 Khui
 Kamharan
 Bullowal
 Ghallian
 Ma'ta'rani
 Darash
 Chungi
 Chouhar wali

Geography and climate 

Kotli Loharan East is situated in Sialkot, Punjab, Pakistan, its geographical coordinates are 32° 34' 50" North, 74° 31' 40" East and its original name is Kotli Lohārān Chardi.
Kotli Loharan is right in the middle of Kharoota Sayedaan & Kotli Loharan West (Landi Kotli). Koti Loharan is cold during winters and hot and humid during summers. May and June are the hottest months. The temperature during winter may drop to 0 °C. The land is, generally, plain and fertile. Most of the rain falls during the Monsoon season in summer which often results in flooding. Most of the people in Kotli Loharan are related with the business of manicure and surgical instrument
,

Local Banks 
List Of Commercial Banks In Kotli Loharan East 

 Habib Bank LTD.
 United Bank LTD.
 MCB Bank LTD.
 Allied Bank LTD.
 Western Union.
 Alflah Bank LTD.
 National Bank of Pakistan

List of Government Facilities 

 GPO (Pakistan Post Office Branch).
 Union Council.
 Wapda Office (Branch).
 PTCL (Pakistan Telecommunication) 
 Government Hospital.
 Government High School For Boys.
 Government High School For Girls.

List of Private Facilities 

 Private Clinic 
 Private Schools
 Insurance companies 
 Petrol Station 
 CNG Station
 Car Wash 
 Jama Masjid
 Eidgah
 Water filtration plant 
 Super Market
 Marriage Halls
 LPG Stations
 Grace College
 Computer Training Institutes 
 Medical Stores 
 Rent a Car

Education 
There are public as well as private school situated at Kotli Loharan. There are two Govt. middle schools separate for boys and girls, Govt Intermediate college for girls and Govt high school for boys. In addition there are many Montessori and English medium schools and two girls college in private sector.

Hospitals 
There was Rural Health Center (RHC) level hospital situated between Kotli Loharan East and West for easy approach. Since 2015 it has been upgraded to Tehsil headquarters (THQ) hospital with new building and more facilities according to THQ level.

Transport 

Local bus services for Kotli Loharan operate from Sialkot main bus station towards Marala Headworks. Kotli Loharan is in the middle of this bus route.

Airport 

Sialkot International Airport is just 10-15 kilometres from Kotli Loharan East. Sialkot International Airport is the first ever private sector airport of Pakistan managed by SIAL. It is noted for having the longest runway in Pakistan, is located near Sambrial. Direct flights are available from Sialkot International Airport to Karachi, Faisalabad and Kuwait. PIA would start non-stop flight between Sialkot to Manchester and Dubai as well as Hajj flights from Sialkot International Airport in 2008. Emirates is also expected to start its flights in mid 2008 to Dubai. Airblue will operate domestically from Islamabad, Multan and Karachi in mid 2008. There is also a small Sialkot Cantonment Airport in Sialkot Cantt in use by the aviation wing of the Pakistan Army. During 1995-1996 this airport was also used as a public airport by PIA for Helicopter Service from Sialkot to Islamabad.

Related
Sialkot
Kotli Loharan West
Kharota Syedan

References

External links
Archived version of Sialkot official website
Sialkot International Airport website

Cities and towns in Sialkot District